The Pratt & Whitney R-2000 Twin Wasp is an American radial engine developed in 1942 to power military aircraft. It is one of the Pratt & Whitney Wasp series of Radial engines.

Design and development
The R-2000 was an enlarged version of the Pratt & Whitney R-1830 Twin Wasp, with focus on reducing the manufacturing costs and fuel requirements. There were a number of detail changes from the R-1830, such as front-mounted instead of rear-mounted magnetos (as with the larger, and earlier Double Wasp), plain bearings for the crankshaft rather than roller bearings, and 87 octane fuel (specified because there were fears wartime supplies of 100 octane might fall short, but those fears were groundless). The R-2000 produced 1,300 hp @ 2,700 rpm with 87 octane, 1,350 hp with 100 octane and 1,450 hp @ 2,800 rpm with 100/130-grade fuel.

Applications
 Aviation Traders Carvair
 Douglas C-54 Skymaster 
 Douglas DC-4
 Douglas Super DC-3
 de Havilland Canada DHC-4 Caribou
 Vought XF5U

Specifications (R-2000-3)

See also

References

Notes

Bibliography
Gunston, Bill. World Encyclopedia of Aero Engines: From the Pioneers to the Present Day. 5th edition, Stroud, UK: Sutton, 2006.
White, Graham. Allied Aircraft Piston Engines of World War II: History and Development of Frontline Aircraft Piston Engines Produced by Great Britain and the United States During World War II. Warrendale, Pennsylvania: SAE International, 1995. 

1940s aircraft piston engines
Aircraft air-cooled radial piston engines
R-2000